This Is My Life is a 1968 album by Shirley Bassey. The mid to late sixties was a period of declining popularity for traditional pop. How much the changing tastes in popular music directly affected Bassey's record sales is difficult to quantify; but her record sales had been faltering since the latter part of the mid 1960s, and the album failed to chart(She did have some success in Italy during this period, where she recorded several songs in Italian, with two making the Top 40 there).

The version of "This Is My Life" appearing on side two is the English-only version, with lyrics by Norman Newell, and would become one of Bassey's signature songs.

The original album was issued in mono and stereo. The stereo version of this album has been released on CD twice, firstly, in the late 1990s, on the EMI 2-CD set Shirley Bassey The Collection and a digitally re-mastered release for CD in 2009 together with Does Anybody Miss Me by BGO Records.

Track listing 
Side One.
"Now You Want To Be Loved" ("Des Ronds Dans L'Eau") (Pierre Barouh, Raymond Le Sénéchal, Sonny Miller) - 2.55
Medley
"Goin' Out of My Head" (Teddy Randazzo, Bobby Weinstein)
"You Go to My Head" (John Frederick Coots, Haven Gillespie) - 2.53
"Softly as I Leave You" (Hal Shaper, Tony De Vita) - 2.27
"A Time for Us" (Larry Kusik, Eddie Snyder, Nino Rota) - 2.27
"The Joker" (Leslie Bricusse, Anthony Newley) - 2.25
"I Must Know" (Neal Hefti, Lil Mattis) - 2.40
Side Two.
"This Is My Life (La vita)" (Bruno Canfora, Antonio Amurri, Norman Newell) - 3.07
"Who Am I?" (Tony Hatch, Jackie Trent) - 2.37
"Funny Girl" (Bob Merrill, Jule Styne) - 2.23
"Sunny" (Bobby Hebb) - 2.42
"I've Been Loved" (Sammy Cahn, Andy Badale) - 2.54
"Where Is Tomorrow?" (Umberto Bindi, Barry Mason) - 2.39

References 

Shirley Bassey albums
1968 albums
Albums produced by Dave Pell
United Artists Records albums